Demetrio Javier Sodi de la Tijera (born September 25, 1944) is a Mexican journalist, businessman and politician who has served in the upper and lower houses of the Congress of the Union, and as head of Miguel Hidalgo borough from 2009 to 2012. In 2006, he unsuccessfully ran as the National Action Party (PAN) candidate for the Head of Government of the Federal District. A member of the Sodi family, he is the cousin of the actress and singer Thalía.

Early life and education 
Demetrio Javier Sodi de la Tijera was born on September 25, 1944 in Mexico City, Mexico. He is the son of Demetrio Sodi Pallares, a cardiologist, professor and prominent researcher in the field of electrocardiography, and Soledad de la Tijera Alarcón.

Sodi studied business administration at the Universidad Iberoamericana and pursued graduate studies at Harvard University.

Political career 
Sodi began his business activities in Grupo Cifra where he worked from 1962 to 1975. In 1977, he entered the public service. At the national level, he coordinated social support programs at Conasupo and was the managing director of Diconsa stores, where he increased the number of stores between 1978 and 1982 from 3,200 to 16,000. He was General Coordinator of Supplies and Food Distribution at the Federal District Department from 1982 to 1987.

In the private sector, his professional career was developed at the Aurrerá supermarket chain (since bought out by Wal-Mart).

Sodi has been a member of three main political parties in Mexico. On September 1, 1988, he was elected to the Chamber of Deputies, where he served as an Institutional Revolutionary Party (PRI) deputy, representing the Federal District's 25th district, from 1988 to 1991 during the LIV Legislature. On November 15, 1991 he took up the position of Representative for the Assembly of Representatives of the Federal District. In 1993, he conceived, planned and organized members from all political parties and citizen organizations to demand for the first plebiscite to achieve more democracy in Mexico City, by pressuring the federal government to establish popular and democratic elections for the Head of Government. He would serve on this position until November 14, 1994. 

That same year in April, he resigned from the PRI, and would go on to join the Party of the Democratic Revolution (PRD) three years later. On September 1, 1997 he was elected to serve once again to the Chamber of Deputies, representing the Federal District's 26th district; then, in 2000 he was elected to the Senate and served during the LVIII Legislature and the LIX Legislature.

In 2005 he resigned from the PRD and was nominated by the National Action Party as its candidate for head of government in the 2006 Federal District local elections, being defeated by Marcelo Ebrard.

During his electoral campaign for Head of Government, Sodi wrote a book entitled "The Inclusive City" where he analyzes, diagnoses and offers government proposals for the Federal District. The book was co-authored by renowned urban researchers such as: Emilio Pradilla Cobos, Lisett Márquez López, Elias Fonseca Chicho and Alejandro Castro.

In 2009, Sodi won the elections for head of Miguel Hidalgo borough in Mexico City, over his opponents Ana Guevara (PRD), and Martín Olavarrieta (PRI) with 39.33% of the vote.

He would become a columnist for the newspaper El Universal and host of the Contrapunto program by Televisa. He chairs the organization Metrópoli 2025, a civil association that currently brings together more than 200 scholars, researchers, businesspeople and politicians worried about the future of the Valley of Mexico.

References

External links 
 Demetrio Sodi, Candidato al gobierno de la Ciudad de México, Distrito Federal, official website
 Demetrio Sodi de la Tijera::Biografías::esmas, biography
 Sodi blog, blog
 Metrópoli 2025, official website of the civil association
 PAN-DF, official website of the National Action Party in the Federal District.
 El Universal Online, daily news from El Universal about Demetrio Sodi

1944 births
Living people
Universidad Iberoamericana alumni
Harvard University alumni
Politicians from Mexico City
Members of the Chamber of Deputies (Mexico)
Members of the Senate of the Republic (Mexico)
Demetrio
Mexican people of Spanish descent
Mexican people of Italian descent
Institutional Revolutionary Party politicians
Party of the Democratic Revolution politicians
National Action Party (Mexico) politicians
21st-century Mexican politicians
20th-century Mexican politicians